This article serves as an index – as complete as possible – of all the honorific orders or similar decorations awarded by Italy, classified by Monarchies chapter and Republics chapter, and, under each chapter, recipients' countries and the detailed list of recipients.

Awards

Italy 
  President Giuseppe Saragat (1964-1971) :
 Grand Master of the Order of Merit of the Italian Republic
 Grand Master of the Military Order of Italy
 Grand Master of the Order of Merit for Labour
 Grand Master of the Order of the Star of Italian Solidarity
 Founding Grand Master of the Order of Vittorio Veneto (1968-1971)
  President Giovanni Leone (1971–1978) :
 Grand Master of the Order of Merit of the Italian Republic
 Grand Master of the Military Order of Italy
 Grand Master of the Order of Merit for Labour
 Grand Master of the Order of the Star of Italy
 Grand Master of the Order of Vittorio Veneto
  President Sandro Pertini (1978–1985) :
 Grand Master of the Order of Merit of the Italian Republic
 Grand Master of the Military Order of Italy
 Grand Master of the Order of Merit for Labour
 Grand Master of the Order of the Star of Italy
 Grand Master of the Order of Vittorio Veneto
  President Francesco Cossiga (1985–1992) :
 Grand Master of the Order of Merit of the Italian Republic
 Knight Grand Cross with Collar of the Order of Merit of the Italian Republic (29 April 1992)
 Grand Master of the Military Order of Italy
 Grand Master of the Order of Merit for Labour
 Grand Master of the Order of the Star of Italian Solidarity
 Grand Master of the Order of Vittorio Veneto 
  President Oscar Luigi Scalfaro (1992–1999) :
 Grand Master of the Order of Merit of the Italian Republic
 Grand Master of the Military Order of Italy
 Grand Master of the Order of Merit for Labour
 Grand Master of the Order of the Star of Italian Solidarity
 Grand Master of the Order of Vittorio Veneto
  President Carlo Azeglio Ciampi (1999–2006) :
 Grand Master of the Order of Merit of the Italian Republic
 Grand Master of the Military Order of Italy
 Grand Master of the Order of Merit for Labour
 Grand Master of the Order of the Star of Italian Solidarity
 Grand Master of the Order of Vittorio Veneto

  President Giorgio Napolitano (2006-incumbent) :
 Grand Master of the Order of Merit of the Italian Republic
 Grand Master of the Military Order of Italy
 Grand Master of the Order of Merit for Labour
 Grand Master of the Order of the Star of Italian Solidarity, now Order of the Star of Italy
 Grand Master of the Order of Vittorio Veneto

Monarchies 
European monarchies

United Kingdom 

 Queen Elizabeth II:  Knight Grand Cross with Collar of the Order of Merit of the Italian Republic (1958)

Norway 
See also decorations pages (mark °): Harald, Sonja, Haakon, Mette-Marit, Mârtha Louise, Astrid & Ragnhild

 Harald V of Norway: Knight Grand Cross (06/1965) with Collar (10/2001) of the Order of Merit of the Italian Republic
 Queen Sonja of Norway: Knight Grand Cross of the Order of Merit of the Italian Republic (19 October 2001)
 Haakon, Crown Prince of Norway: Knight Grand Cross of the Order of Merit of the Italian Republic (September 2004)
 Mette-Marit, Crown Princess of Norway: Knight Grand Cross of the Order of Merit of the Italian Republic (September 2004)

Sweden 

 Carl XVI Gustaf of Sweden: Knight Grand Cross with Collar of the Order of Merit of the Italian Republic (8 April 1991)
 Queen Silvia of Sweden: Knight Grand Cross of the Order of Merit of the Italian Republic (8 April 1991)
 Princess Christina, Mrs. Magnuson:Knight Grand Cross of the Order of Merit of the Italian Republic (5 May 1998)

Denmark 
See also decorations pages (click on "Decorations"):  Margrethe - Henrik - Frederik - Mary - Joachim - Marie - Benedikte

 Margrethe II of Denmark: Dame Grand Cross (20 April 1964) with Collar (8 November 1977) of the Order of Merit of the Italian Republic
 Frederik, Crown Prince of Denmark: Knight Grand Cross of the Order of Merit of the Italian Republic (19 October 1993)
 Princess Benedikte of Denmark: Knight Grand Cross of the Order of Merit of the Italian Republic (20 April 1964)

Netherlands 

 Princess Beatrix of the Netherlands: Knight Grand Cross (23 October 1973) with Collar (27 March 1985) of the Order of Merit of the Italian Republic
 Princess Margriet of the Netherlands: Dame Grand Cross of the Order of Merit of the Italian Republic (23 October 1973)
 Pieter van Vollenhoven: Knight Grand Cross of the Order of Merit of the Italian Republic (23 October 1973)

Belgium 

 King Albert II
 : Knight Grand Cross (29 October 1973) with Collar (12 August 1998) of the Order of Merit of the Italian Republic
: Knight of the Order of the Most Holy Annunciation
: Knight Grand Cross of the Order of Saints Maurice and Lazarus
 Queen Paola:
 : Knight Grand Cross of the Order of Merit of the Italian Republic (12 May 1998)

Luxembourg 

 Henri, Grand Duke of Luxembourg: Knight Grand Cross with Collar of the Order of Merit of the Italian Republic (14 March 2003)
 Maria Teresa, Grand Duchess of Luxembourg: Knight Grand Cross of the Order of Merit of the Italian Republic (30 January 2009)
 Guillaume, Hereditary Grand Duke of Luxembourg: Knight Grand Cross of the Order of Merit of the Italian Republic (30 January 2009)

Spain 

 Juan Carlos I of Spain: Knight Grand Cross with Collar of the Order of Merit of the Italian Republic (26 May 1980)
 Queen Sofía of Spain: Knight Grand Cross of the Order of Merit of the Italian Republic (27 June 1996)
 Felipe, Prince of Asturias: Knight Grand Cross of the Order of Merit of the Italian Republic (27 June 1996)
 Infanta Elena, Duchess of Lugo: Knight Grand Cross of the Order of Merit of the Italian Republic (27 June 1996)

Monaco 

 Albert II, Prince of Monaco: Knight Grand Cross with Grand Cordon of the Order of Merit of the Italian Republic (12 December 2005)
 Charlene, Princess of Monaco : Grand Cross of the Order of the Star of Italy (20 February 2014)

African monarchies

Morocco 
 King Mohammed VI of Morocco (1999-incumbent): Knight Grand Cross with Collar of the Order of Merit of the Italian Republic (11 April 2000)

Middle East monarchies

Jordan 

 Queen Noor of Jordan: Knight Grand Cross of the Order of Merit of the Italian Republic (26 November 1983)
 Abdullah II of Jordan: Knight Grand Cross (15 January 1987) with Grand Cordon  (9 February 2001) of the Order of Merit of the Italian Republic
 Queen Rania of Jordan: Dame Grand Cross of the Order of Merit of the Italian Republic (19 October 2009)
 Prince Hamzah bin Al Hussein, son of Queen Noor of Jordan, half-brother of Abdullah II of Jordan: Knight Grand Cross of the Order of Merit of the Italian Republic (14 February 2001)
 Prince Muhammad bin Talal, eldest younger brother of King Hussein I of Jordan: Knight Grand Cross of the Order of Merit of the Republic (26 November 1983)
 Prince Hassan bin Talal, youngest brother of King Hussein I of Jordan: Knight Grand Cross of the Order of Merit of the Italian Republic (26 November 1983)
Late members
 Hussein of Jordan: Knight Grand Cross with Collar of the Order of Merit of the Italian Republic (26 November 1983)

Kuwait 

 Emir Sabah Al-Ahmad Al-Jaber Al-Sabah of Kuwait (2006-incumbent): Knight Grand Cross with Collar of the Order of Merit of the Italian Republic (26 April 2010)

Oman 
 Qaboos bin Said al Said: Knight Grand Cross with Collar of the Order of Merit of the Italian Republic

Qatar 

 Hamad bin Khalifa Al Thani (1995–2013): Knight Grand Cross with Collar of the Order of Merit of the Italian Republic (26 April 2000)

Saudi Arabia 
 King Fahd of Saudi Arabia (1982–2005): Knight Grand Cross with Collar of the Order of Merit of the Italian Republic (19 July 1997)
 King Abdullah of Saudi Arabia (2005–incumbent): Knight Grand Cross with Collar of the Order of Merit of the Italian Republic (30 October 2007)

Asian monarchies

Thailand 

 Queen Sirikit of Thailand: Dame Grand Cross of The Order of Merit of the Italian Republic (22 September 1960)

Malaysia

Perlis 

 Sultan Sirajuddin of Perlis (as Yang di-Pertuan Agong of Malaysia, December 2001 – December 2006):
 Knight Grand Cross with Collar of the Order of Merit of the Italian Republic (9 June 2003)
 Tuanku Fauziah (Sultan Sirajuddin of Perlis's wife) :
 Dame Grand Cross of the Order of Merit of the Italian Republic (9 June 2003)

Japan 
 Emperor Akihito: Knight Grand Cross of the Order of Merit of the Italian Republic (9 March 1982)
 Crown Prince Naruhito: Knight Grand Cross of the Order of Merit of the Italian Republic (9 March 1982)
 Prince Akishino: Knight Grand Cross of the Order of Merit of the Italian Republic(12 April 1998)

Oceanan monarchies

Former monarchies

Iran 
 Mohammad Reza Pahlavi: Knight Grand Cross with Collar of the Order of Merit of the Italian Republic (26 August 1957)
 Farah Pahlavi: Knight Grand Cross with Collar of the Order of Merit of the Italian Republic (15 December 1974)
 Crown Prince Cyrus-Reza Pahlavi: Knight Grand Cross with Collar of the Order of Merit of the Italian Republic (15 December 1974)

Order of Malta 
 Andrew Bertie (1988-2008): Knight Grand Cross with Collar of the Order of Merit of the Italian Republic (22 May 1990)
 Fra' Matthew Festing (2008-): Knight Grand Cross with Collar of the Order of Merit of the Italian Republic (27 October 2008)

Republics 

 Republics of Europe

Albania 

  President Sali Berisha (1992–1997): Knight Grand Cross with Collar of the Order of Merit of the Italian Republic (23 April 1996)

Austria 

  President Thomas Klestil (1992-2004): Knight Grand Cross with Collar of the Order of Merit of the Italian Republic (27 January 1993)
  President Heinz Fischer (2004-incumbent): Knight Grand Cross with Collar of the Order of Merit of the Italian Republic (8 June 2007)

  President Georgi Parvanov (2002-2012): Knight Grand Cross with Collar of the Order of Merit of the Italian Republic (5 April 2005)

Croatia 
  President Stjepan Mesić (2000–2010): Knight Grand Cross with Collar of the Order of Merit of the Italian Republic (5 October 2001)

  President Ivo Josipović (2010-incumbent): Knight Grand Cross with Collar of the Order of Merit of the Italian Republic (6 July 2011)

Czech Republic 
  President Václav Havel (1993–2003): Knight Grand Cross with Collar of the Order of Merit of the Italian Republic (27 March 2002)

Estonia 
  President Lennart Meri (1992-2001): Knight Grand Cross with Collar of the Order of Merit of the Italian Republic (22 May 1997)

  President Arnold Rüütel (2001–2006): Knight Grand Cross with Collar of the Order of Merit of the Italian Republic (8 April 2004)

Finland 

  President Mauno Henrik Koivisto (1982–1994): Knight Grand Cross with Collar of the Order of Merit of the Italian Republic (14 September 1993)

  President Martti Ahtisaari (1994–2000): Knight Grand Cross with Collar of the Order of Merit of the Italian Republic (28 January 1997)

  President Tarja Halonen (2000–2012): Knight Grand Cross with Collar of the Order of Merit of the Italian Republic (1 September 2008)

France 
  President René Coty (1954-1959): Knight Grand Cross with Collar of the Order of Merit of the Italian Republic (6 December 1954)
  President Charles de Gaulle (1959–1969): Knight Grand Cross with Collar of the Order of Merit of the Italian Republic (16 June 1959)
  President Georges Pompidou (1969–1974): Knight Grand Cross (19 February 1964) with Collar (1 October 1973) of the Order of Merit of the Italian Republic
  President Valéry Giscard d'Estaing (1974-1981), when minister: Grand Officer (19 February 1964) and Knight Grand Cross (1 October 1973) of the Order of Merit of the Italian Republic

  President François Mitterrand (1981-1995): Knight Grand Cross with Collar of the Order of Merit of the Italian Republic (5 July 1982)
  Danielle Mitterrand, his wife: Dame Grand Cross of the Order of Merit of the Italian Republic (26 January 1990)
  President Jacques Chirac (1995-2007): Knight Grand Cross (1 October 1973) with Collar (21 October 1999) of the Order of Merit of the Italian Republic

  President François Hollande (2012-incumbent): Knight Grand Cross with Collar of the Order of Merit of the Italian Republic (15 November 2012)

Germany 

  President Karl Carstens (1979-1984): Grand Officer (19 December 1959), Knight Grand Cross (8 August 1965) with Collar (18 September 1979) of the Order of Merit of the Italian Republic

  President Richard von Weizsäcker (1984–1994): Knight Grand Cross with Collar of the Order of Merit of the Italian Republic
  Marianne von Weizsäcker, his wife: Dame Grand Cross of the Order of Merit of the Italian Republic (24 April 1986)
  President Roman Herzog (1994–1999): Knight Grand Cross with Collar of the Order of Merit of the Italian Republic (20 April 1997)

  President Johannes Rau (1999-2004): Knight Grand Cross with Collar of the Order of Merit of the Italian Republic (22 March 2002)
  Christina Rau, his wife: Dame Grand Cross of the Order of Merit of the Italian Republic (12 April 2002)
  President Horst Köhler (2004-2010): Knight Grand Cross with Collar of the Order of Merit of the Italian Republic (15 March 2006)
  Eva Köhler, his wife: Dame Grand Cross of the Order of Merit of the Italian Republic (21 March 2006)

  President Joachim Gauck (2012-incumbent): Knight Grand Cross with Collar of the Order of Merit of the Italian Republic (20 February 2013)

Greece 
  President Konstantinos Karamanlis (1980–85, 1990–95): Knight Grand Cross with Collar of the Order of Merit of the Italian Republic (18 November 1980)

  President Konstantinos Stephanopoulos (1995–2005): Knight Grand Cross with Collar of the Order of Merit of the Italian Republic (23 January 2001)
  President Karolos Papoulias (2005-incumbent): Knight Grand Cross with Collar of the Order of Merit of the Italian Republic (18 January 2006)

Hungary 

  President Árpád Göncz (1990–2000): Knight Grand Cross with Collar of the Order of Merit of the Italian Republic (15 July 1991)

  President Ferenc Mádl (2000–2005): Knight Grand Cross with Collar of the Order of Merit of the Italian Republic (17 June 2002)

Iceland 

  President Vigdís Finnbogadóttir (1980–1996): Knight Grand Cross with Collar of the Order of Merit of the Italian Republic (5 October 1987)

Ireland 
  President Patrick Hillery (1976–1990): Knight Grand Cross with Collar of the Order of Merit of the Italian Republic (25 July 1986)

Latvia 
  President Guntis Ulmanis (1993–1999): Knight Grand Cross with Collar of the Order of Merit of the Italian Republic (21 May 1997)

  President Vaira Vīķe-Freiberga (1999-2007): Knight Grand Cross with Collar of the Order of Merit of the Italian Republic (8 April 2004)

Lithuania 

  President Algirdas Brazauskas (1993–1998): Knight Grand Cross with Collar of the Order of Merit of the Italian Republic (20 May 1997)

  President Valdas Adamkus (1998–2003, 2004–2009): Knight Grand Cross with Collar of the Order of Merit of the Italian Republic (23 February 1999)

Malta 

  President Ċensu Tabone (1989-1994): Knight Grand Cross with Collar of the Order of Merit of the Italian Republic (18 September 1991)
  President Ugo Mifsud Bonnici (1994-1999): Knight Grand Cross with Collar of the Order of Merit of the Italian Republic (16 November 1995)
  President Guido de Marco (1999–2004): Knight Grand Cross with Collar of the Order of Merit of the Italian Republic (16 January 2004)
  President Eddie Fenech Adami (2004–2009): Knight Grand Cross with Collar of the Order of Merit of the Italian Republic (11 May 2005)
  President George Abela (2009-incumbent): Knight Grand Cross with Collar of the Order of Merit of the Italian Republic (25 June 2010)

Poland 

  President Wojciech Jaruzelski (1985-1990): Knight Grand Cross with Collar of the Order of Merit of the Italian Republic (12 May 1989)

  President Aleksander Kwaśniewski (1995–2005): Knight Grand Cross with Collar of the Order of Merit of the Italian Republic (28 May 1996)

 Bronisław Komorowski (2010-incumbent): Knight Grand Cross with Collar of the Order of Merit of the Italian Republic (10 June 2012)

Portugal 
  President António Santos Ramalho Eanes (1976–1986): Knight Grand Cross with Collar of the Order of Merit of the Italian Republic (14 May 1980)

  President Mário Alberto Nobre Lopes Soares (1986-1996): Knight Grand Cross with Collar of the Order of Merit of the Italian Republic (5 April 1989)

  President Jorge Sampaio (1996–2006): Knight Grand Cross with Collar of the Order of Merit of the Italian Republic (27 November 2001)

Romania 

  President Ion Iliescu (1989–96, 2000–04): Knight Grand Cross with Collar of the Order of Merit of the Italian Republic, (15 October 2003)

  President Traian Băsescu (2004-incumbent): Knight Grand Cross with Collar of the Order of Merit of the Italian Republic (7 September 2011)

Russia 

  President Boris Yeltsin (1991–1999): Knight Grand Cross with Collar of the Order of Merit of the Italian Republic (19 December 1991)

San Marino 
 Adalmiro Bartolini, Captain Regent (1 April - 1 October 1990): Knight Grand Cross with Collar of the Order of Merit of the Italian Republic (11 June 1990)
 Ottaviano Rossi, Captain Regent (1 April - 1 October 1990): Knight Grand Cross with Collar of the Order of Merit of the Italian Republic (11 June 1990)
 Luigi Mazza, Captain Regent (1 October 1997 – 1 April 1998): Knight Grand Cross with Collar of the Order of Merit of the Italian Republic (3 March 1998)
 Marino Zanotti, Captain Regent (1 October 1997 – 1 April 1998):  Knight Grand Cross with Collar of the Order of Merit of the Italian Republic (3 March 1998)
 Alberto Cecchetti, Captain Regent (1 October 2001 – 1 April 2002): Knight Grand Cross with Collar of the Order of Merit of the Italian Republic (11 March 2002)
 Gino Giovagnoli, Captain Regent (1 October 2001 – 1 April 2002): Knight Grand Cross with Collar of the Order of Merit of the Italian Republic (11 March 2002)

Serbia and Montenegro 

  President Vojislav Koštunica (2000–2003): Knight Grand Cross with Collar of the Order of Merit of the Italian Republic (14 January 2002)

Slovakia 
  President Michal Kováč (1993–1998): Knight Grand Cross with Collar of the Order of Merit of the Italian Republic (13 November 1997)
  President Rudolf Schuster (1999–2004): Knight Grand Cross with Collar of the Order of Merit of the Italian Republic, (28 June 2002)

  President Ivan Gašparovič (2004-incumbent): Knight Grand Cross with Collar of the Order of Merit of the Italian Republic, (20 February 2007)

Slovenia 

  President Danilo Türk (2007–2012): Knight Grand Cross with Collar of the Order of Merit of the Italian Republic (11 January 2011)

Turkey 
  President Fahri Korutürk (1973–1980): Knight Grand Cross with Collar of the Order of Merit of the Italian Republic (29 April 1978)
  President Süleyman Demirel (1993–2000): Knight Grand Cross with Collar of the Order of Merit of the Italian Republic (7 October 1996)

  President Abdullah Gül (2007-incumbent): Knight Grand Cross with Collar of the Order of Merit of the Italian Republic, (30 October 2009)

Ukraine 
  President Leonid Kuchma (1994–2005): Knight Grand Cross with Collar of the Order of Merit of the Italian Republic (3 May 1995)

Yugoslavia (1992-2006) 
  President Josip Broz Tito (1953-1980):  Knight Grand Cross with Collar of the Order of Merit of the Italian Republic (2 October 1969)
  President Cvijetin Mijatović (1980–1981): Knight Grand Cross with Collar of the Order of Merit of the Italian Republic (17 December 1980)

Republics of the Middle East

Lebanon 

  President Elias Hrawi (1989-1998): Knight Grand Cross with Collar of the Order of Merit of the Italian Republic (5 November 1997)

  President Michel Suleiman (2008-incumbent): Knight Grand Cross with Collar of the Order of Merit of the Italian Republic, (14 October 2008)

Palestinian Authority 
  President Yasser Arafat (1994-2004): Knight Grand Cross with Collar of the Order of Merit of the Italian Republic (19 February 1999)

 Republics of the Far East

Kazakhstan 
  President Nursultan Nazarbayev (1990-incumbent): Knight Grand Cross with Collar of the Order of Merit of the Italian Republic (4 May 1997)

Philippines 
  President Corazon Aquino (1986–1992): Knight Grand Cross with Collar of the Order of Merit of the Italian Republic (16 June 1988)

South Korea 

  President Kim Dae-jung (1998-2003): Knight Grand Cross with Collar of the Order of Merit of the Italian Republic (2 March 2000)

  President Lee Myung-bak (2008–2013): Knight Grand Cross with Collar of the Order of Merit of the Italian Republic, (2 September 2009)

Uzbekistan 
  President Islam Karimov (1990-incumbent): Knight Grand Cross with Collar of the Order of Merit of the Italian Republic (2 May 1997)

 Republics of the Americas

Argentina 
  President Raúl Alfonsín (1983-1989): Knight Grand Cross with Collar of the Order of Merit of the Italian Republic (11 March 1985)
  President Carlos Menem (1989-1999): Knight Grand Cross with Collar of the Order of Merit of the Italian Republic (5 October 1992)
  President Fernando de la Rúa (1999-2001): Knight Grand Cross with Collar of the Order of Merit of the Italian Republic (7 March 2001)

Brazil 

  President Fernando Henrique Cardoso (1995–2003): Knight Grand Cross with Collar of the Order of Merit of the Italian Republic (24 June 1995)

Chile 
  President Patricio Aylwin Azócar (1990-1994): Knight Grand Cross with Collar of the Order of Merit of the Italian Republic (17 April 1991)

  President Eduardo Frei Ruiz-Tagle (1994-2000): Knight Grand Cross with Collar of the Order of Merit of the Italian Republic (19 July 1995)

  President Ricardo Lagos (2000-2006): Knight Grand Cross with Collar of the Order of Merit of the Italian Republic (3 March 2000)

  Mme President Michelle Bachelet (2006–2010): Knight Grand Cross with Collar of the Order of Merit of the Italian Republic, (9 October 2007)

Colombia 
  President Julio César Turbay Ayala (1978-1982): Knight Grand Cross with Collar of the Order of Merit of the Italian Republic (1 April 1981)

Costa Rica 
  President Rodrigo Carazo Odio (1978–1982): Knight Grand Cross with Collar of the Order of Merit of the Italian Republic (30 March 1981)
  President Luis Alberto Monge (1982–1986): Knight Grand Cross with Collar of the Order of Merit of the Italian Republic (20 June 1984)

Dominican Republic 

  President Leonel Fernández (1996–2000, 2004–12): Knight Grand Cross with Collar of the Order of Merit of the Italian Republic (19 January 1999)

Mexico 

  President Luis Echeverría (1970–1976): Knight Grand Cross with Collar of the Order of Merit of the Italian Republic (8 February 1974)
  President José López Portillo (1976-1982): Knight Grand Cross with Collar of the Order of Merit of the Italian Republic

  President Ernesto Zedillo (1994-2000): Knight Grand Cross with Collar of the Order of Merit of the Italian Republic (26 March 1996)

Peru 
  President Alejandro Toledo (2001–2006): Knight Grand Cross with Collar of the Order of Merit of the Italian Republic, (4 December 2002)

Uruguay 
  President Julio María Sanguinetti (1985–1990, 1995-2000): Knight Grand Cross with Collar of the Order of Merit of the Italian Republic (21 July 1995)

  President Jorge Batlle Ibáñez (2000-2005): Knight Grand Cross with Collar of the Order of Merit of the Italian Republic (7 March 2001)

Venezuela 
  President Carlos Andrés Pérez (1974–1979, 1989-1993): Knight Grand Cross with Collar of the Order of Merit of the Italian Republic (17 November 1976)

  President Jaime Lusinchi (1984-1989): Knight Grand Cross with Collar of the Order of Merit of the Italian Republic (6 June 1988)

  President Rafael Caldera (1994-1999): Knight Grand Cross with Collar of the Order of Merit of the Italian Republic (29 June 1995)

 Republics of Africa

Algeria 

  President Abdelaziz Bouteflika (1999-incumbent): Knight Grand Cross with Collar of the Order of Merit of the Italian Republic (15 November 1999)

Egypt 
  President Anwar Sadat (1970–1981): Knight Grand Cross with Collar of the Order of Merit of the Italian Republic (6 April 1976)
  President Mohamed Hosni Mubarak (1981–2011): Knight Grand Cross with Collar of the Order of Merit of the Italian Republic (30 January 1982)

Gabon 
  President Omar Bongo (1967–2009): Knight Grand Cross with Collar of the Order of Merit of the Italian Republic (21 November 1973)

Ghana 

  President John Kufuor (2001-2009): Knight Grand Cross with Collar of the Order of Merit of the Italian Republic, (11 October 2006)

Mozambique 
  President Samora Machel (1975–1986): Knight Grand Cross with Collar of the Order of Merit of the Italian Republic (14 October 1981)

South Africa 

  President Thabo Mbeki (1999–2008): Knight Grand Cross with Collar of the Order of Merit of the Italian Republic (6 March 2002)

References 

 
Italy